Generally speaking, a calendar year begins on the New Year's Day of the given calendar system and ends on the day before the following New Year's Day, and thus consists of a whole number of days. A year can also be measured by starting on any other named day of the calendar, and ending on the day before this named day in the following year.  This may be termed a "year's time", but not a "calendar year".  To reconcile the calendar year with the astronomical cycle (which has a fractional number of days) certain years contain extra days ("leap days" or "intercalary days").The Gregorian year, which is in use in most of the world, begins on January 1 and ends on December 31. It has a length of 365 days in an ordinary year, with 8760 hours, 525,600 minutes, or 31,536,000 seconds; but 366 days in a leap year, with 8784 hours, 527,040 minutes, or 31,622,400 seconds. With 97 leap years every 400 years, the year has an average length of 365.2425 days. Other formula-based calendars can have lengths which are further out of step with the solar cycle: for example, the Julian calendar has an average length of 365.25 days, and the Hebrew calendar has an average length of 365.2468 days. The Islamic calendar is a lunar calendar consisting of 12 months in a year of 354 or 355 days. Each Gregorian year has 179 even-numbered days; ordinary years have 186 odd-numbered days, but leap years have 187 odd-numbered days. The astronomer's mean tropical year, which is averaged over equinoxes and solstices, is currently 365.24219 days, slightly shorter than the average length of the year in most calendars, but the astronomer's value changes over time, so John Herschel's suggested correction to the Gregorian calendar may become unnecessary by the year 4000.

Quarters
The calendar year can be divided into four quarters, often abbreviated as Q1, Q2, Q3, and Q4.In the Gregorian calendar:
First quarter, Q1: 1 January – 31 March (90 days or 91 days in leap years) 
Second quarter, Q2: 1 April – 30 June (91 days)
Third quarter, Q3: 1 July – 30 September (92 days)
Fourth quarter, Q4: 1 October – 31 December (92 days)

While in the Chinese calendar, the quarters are traditionally associated with the 4 seasons of the year:
Spring: 1st to 3rd month
Summer: 4th to 6th month
Autumn: 7th to 9th month
Winter: 10th to 12th month

See also

Academic term
Calendar reform
Common year
Fiscal year
ISO 8601
ISO week date
Leap year
Model year
Tropical year
Seasonal year

References

Year
Units of time
Types of year